Beat Gähwiler (born January 26, 1965) is a retired decathlete from Switzerland, who finished in twelfth place (8114 points) at the 1988 Summer Olympics in Seoul, South Korea. He also competed at the 1992 Summer Olympics in Barcelona, Spain, ending up in 21st place. He is a five-time national champion in the men's decathlon.

References
 
 1988 Year List

External links
 

1965 births
Living people
Swiss decathletes
Athletes (track and field) at the 1988 Summer Olympics
Athletes (track and field) at the 1992 Summer Olympics
Olympic athletes of Switzerland